Jimmy Johnson (1940 − 8 July 2020) was a Nigerian actor, writer and broadcaster, best known for his role Okoro of the Nigerian Television Authority 1980s TV series The Village Headmaster. On July 8, 2020, Johnson died at Garki hospital, Abuja at the age of 80.

Career
Beginning his stage career in Ibadan in the early 1960s, Johnson worked with Wole Soyinka in the Orisun Theatre Company and at the Mbari Club, a centre for cultural activity that attracted writers, artists and musicians of African descent from all over Africa, the Americas and the Caribbean, including Soyinka, Ulli Beier, Chinua Achebe, Christopher Okigbo, Mabel Segun, J. P. Clark, Christopher Kolade, Lindsay Barrett, Demas Nwoko, Tunji Oyelana, Jimi Solanke and Bruce Onobrakpeya.

Johnson went entered into public service after the Nigeria Civil War (1967–1970) and worked as information and culture officer.

References

External links 
 

2020 deaths
Nigerian male film actors
21st-century Nigerian male actors
Date of birth missing
Yoruba actors
Nigerian male television actors
20th-century Nigerian male actors
Nigerian writers
Nigerian television personalities
Nigerian television presenters
1940 births